Vita Karoli Magni (Life of Charlemagne) is a biography of Charlemagne, King of the Franks and Holy Roman Emperor, written by Einhard. The Life of Charlemagne is a 33 chapter account starting with the full genealogy of the Merovingian family, going through the rise of the Carolingian dynasty, and then detailing the exploits and temperament of King Charles. It has long been seen as one of the key sources for the reign of Charlemagne and provides insight into the court of King Charles and the events that surrounded him.

Content of Vita Karoli Magni 
The work begins with a preface that is mainly Einhard explaining why he is writing the book, highlighting the idea that he feels it is his duty and that he had such love for Charles that he felt that it would be a tragedy if he was forgotten. The book then moves onto the full of the Merovingian family and how the Carolingian came to power, briefly describing the kingship of Pippin and the years of joint rule between Charlemagne and Carloman. 

A large section of the book is then dedicated to going through King Charles many conquest and military campaigns. Einhard goes to great efforts to frame all of the conquests as justified and even righteous; in most cases, however, he is vague on the details of how the wars went and simply summaries the reasons for why they started and what the outcome was.

Einhard then describes at length both Charlemagne physical appearance and his personality, making sure to highlight all the good qualities of Charles, especially his piety and moderation in all worldly pleasures. In this section of the book Einhard also takes time to talk about some of Charles many kids and seemingly tries to explain the reason that Charlemagne never let his daughters marry was because he simply loved them too much to be parted from them. However it is Einhard's very brief description of the rebellion of Pippin the Hunchback that is of great importance as we know much more about Pippin than what Einhard says and many historians have seen it as blatant historical revisionism by Einhard.

The final part of the book deals mainly with Charlemagne being crowned Roman Emperor on Christmas day of the year 800 and it also lays out his death and will as well as the ascension of his son Louis the Pious. The book clams that Charles had no idea that he was to be crowned emperor going so far as to state that:

"He at first had such an aversion that he declared that he would not have set foot in the Church the day that they [the imperial titles] were conferred, although it was a great feast-day, if he could have foreseen the design of the Pope".

There has been a great debate among historians as to whether this view put forward by Einhard is correct, with most modern historians having reached the conclusion that Charlemagne must have definitely known about the Pope's plans long before it happened. The work ends with a copy of Charlemagne's will and a description of his burial bringing the book to a close on a rather somber note.

Literary context
Historians have traditionally described the work as the first example of a biography of a European king. The author tried to imitate the style of that of the ancient Roman biographer Gaius Suetonius Tranquillus, who is most famous for his Lives of the Caesars. Einhard's biography used especially the model of the biography of Emperor Augustus, the first emperor of the Roman Empire.

Date
The date of the work is uncertain, and a number of theories have been put forward. The inclusion of Charlemagne's will at the end of the work makes it fairly clear that it was written after his death in 814. The first reference to the work, however, comes in a letter to Einhard from Lupus of Ferrieres, which is dated to the mid-9th century. Dates have been suggested ranging from about 817 to 833, usually based on interpretations of the text in the political context of the first years of the reign of Louis the Pious and Louis's attitude to his father. No theory has yet emerged as an obvious frontrunner, and it is likely that debate will continue.

Author

Einhard's book is about intimate glimpses of Charlemagne's personal habits and tastes. He occupied a favoured position at Charlemagne's court so he had inside information. Einhard received advanced schooling at the monastery of Fulda sometime after 779. He was an exceptional student and was quite knowledgeable. The word was sent to Charlemagne of Einhard's expertise. He was then sent to Charlemagne’s Palace School at Aachen in 791. Einhard then received employment at Charlemagne's Frankish court about 796. He remained at this position for twenty some years. Einhard's book was expressly intended to convey his appreciation for advanced education. He wrote his biography after he had left Aachen and was living in Seligenstadt.

Einhard and Charlemagne
Einhard's position while with Charlemagne was that of a modern minister of public works so he had intimate knowledge of his court. Einhard was also given the responsibility of many of Charlemagne's abbeys. It used to be suggested that Einhard's wife, Emma, was a daughter of Charlemagne; that can generally be disregarded as a twelfth-century fabrication, however, since there is no proof.

Reliability
Most biographies of the Middle Ages related only good deeds of their subject, with many embellishments to improve their subject. Einhard's biography, however, is considered, for the most part, to be a trustworthy account of Charlemagne's life. It is considered an excellent account of earlier Medieval life. Despite Einhard's limitations, since it was his first attempt at a major writing, the British historian Thomas Hodgkin said, "almost all our real, vivifying knowledge of Charles the Great is derived from Einhard, and that the Vita Karoli Magni is one of the most precious literary bequests of the early Middle Ages."

Notes

Sources

Translations
 Chiesa, P. Vita Karoli. Florence: SISMEL / Ed. del Galluzzo, 2014.

Studies
 
 
 
 
 
 Latowsky, Anne A. (2013). Emperor of the World: Charlemagne and the Construction of Imperial Authority, 800-1229. Ithaca, N.Y.–London: Cornell University Press.

External links

 Full Latin text at the Latin Library
 , translated by A.J. Grant

9th-century Latin books
Charlemagne
Biographies about royalty
Latin biographies
Carolingian Latin historical texts